Zimbabwe competed at the 1992 Summer Olympics in Barcelona, Spain.

Competitors
The following is the list of number of competitors in the Games.

Results by event

Athletics
Men's 100m metres
Fabian Muyaba 
 Heat — 10.84 (→ did not advance)

Men's 5.000 metres
Tendai Chimusasa
 Heat — 13:50.16 (→ did not advance)

Men's 10.000 metres
Tendai Chimusasa
 Heat — 29:17.26 (→ did not advance)

Men's Marathon
 Cephas Matafi — 2:26.17 (→ 58th place)

Men's Long Jump
Ndabazinhle Mdhlongwa 
 Qualification — 6.96 m (→ did not advance)

Men's Triple Jump
Ndabazinhle Mdhlongwa 
 Qualification — 14.96 m (→ did not advance)

Diving
Men's 3m Springboard
Evan Stewart
 Preliminary Round — 345.87 points (→ did not advance, 20th place)

Women's 3m Springboard
 Tracy Cox-Smyth
 Preliminary Heat — 277.95 (→ did not advance, 13th place)

Swimming
Men's 50m Freestyle
 Ivor Le Roux
 Heat — 24.32 (→ did not advance, 46th place)

 Rhoderick McGown
 Heat — 24.75 (→ did not advance, 51st place)

Men's 100m Freestyle
 Ivor Le Roux
 Heat — 52.92 (→ did not advance, 46th place)

 Rhoderick McGown
 Heat — 53.65 (→ did not advance, 54th place)

Men's 200m Freestyle
 Ivor Le Roux
 Heat — 1:56.17 (→ did not advance, 38th place)

 Rhoderick McGown
 Heat — 53.65 (→ did not advance, 54th place)

Women's 100m Backstroke
 Sarah Murphy
 Heat — 1:07.47 (→ did not advance, 42nd place)

 Storme Moodie
 Heat — 1:07.60 (→ did not advance, 43rd place)

Women's 200m Backstroke
 Storme Moodie
 Heat — 2:23.26 (→ did not advance, 39th place)

 Sarah Murphy
 Heat — 2:24.58 (→ did not advance, 40th place)

References

Sources
Official Olympic Reports
sports-reference

Nations at the 1992 Summer Olympics
1992
1992 in Zimbabwean sport